Leptomantis, known as slim treefrogs,  is a genus of frogs found from southern peninsular Thailand to the Philippines. Species in the genus Leptomantis were formerly considered part of the genus Rhacophorus.

Species
The following species are recognised in the genus Leptomantis:
 Leptomantis angulirostris (Ahl, 1927)
 Leptomantis belalongensis (Dehling and Grafe, 2008)
 Leptomantis bimaculatus Peters, 1867
 Leptomantis cyanopunctatus (Manthey and Steiof, 1998)
 Leptomantis fasciatus (Boulenger, 1895)
 Leptomantis gadingensis (Das and Haas, 2005)
 Leptomantis gauni (Inger, 1966)
 Leptomantis harrissoni (Inger and Haile, 1959)
 Leptomantis malkmusi (Dehling, 2015)
 Leptomantis penanorum (Dehling, 2008)
 Leptomantis pseudacutirostris (Dehling, 2011)
 Leptomantis robinsonii (Boulenger, 1903)
 Leptomantis rufipes (Inger, 1966)

References

 
Rhacophoridae
Gliding animals